1 Harbour Street is a Category B listed building in Peterhead, Aberdeenshire, Scotland. Dating to the late 18th century, the building stands at the corner of Jamaica Street, onto which the property's garage faces.

Harbour Street was, in 1739, described as "presently a building". The footprint of the building is clearly shown on the Ordnance Survey's large scale Scottish town plan, surveyed in 1868.

See also
List of listed buildings in Peterhead, Aberdeenshire

References

External links
Peterhead, 1 Harbour Street, Harbour Garage - Canmore.org.uk

Category B listed buildings in Aberdeenshire
Harbour Street 1